Nicolaas Jozef Hubertus (Hubert or Huub) Levigne (30 September 1905 – 29 December 1989) was a Dutch graphic artist, glazier and professor.

Life and work 
Hubert or Huub Levigne was a son of Nicolas Joseph Levigne and Elisabeth Ramakers. He then left for Amsterdam to study at the Rijksakademie van beeldende kunsten (1928–1932), where he was taught by Jan Aarts (graphics) and Rik Roland Holst (monumental art).

He also joined the Nederlandsche Vereeniging voor Ambachts- en Nijverheidskunst.

After completing his training in Amsterdam in 1933 and after winning the silver medal at the Prix de Rome, he returned to Maastricht. In addition to his own free work, he also carried out commissions for postage stamps, occasional graphics, ex libris and ecclesiastical art. Levigne worked with copper engravings, etchings, woodcuts and with a combination of etchings and aquatint. He also painted and made monumental work such as tile pictures and stained glass. Levigne was a pupil of Roland Holst, but his glassware mainly shows the influence of the Limburg glaziers.

In 1950 Levigne,  and Frits Peutz were appointed professors at the Jan van Eyck Academy. Ten Horn taught monumental painting and glazing, Peutz taught architecture and Levigne taught graphic design. He held this position until his retirement in 1972. After this he lived in Spain for a few years and then again until his death in Limburg.

Works

 Stained glass windows (1942–1950) for the Sint-Monulphus en Gondulphuskerk in Berg
 Stained glass (1948) for the Johannes de Doperkerk in Katwijk aan den Rijn
 Stained glass (1948) for the H.H. Nicolaas en Barbarakerk in Valkenburg
 Stained glass windows (1948–1951) for the Sint-Petrus' Bandenkerk in Heer
 Two memorial windows of the Limburg evacuees (1949) in front of the provinciehuis in Leeuwarden
 War memorial (plaque) in the Employment Office in Leeuwarden
 Twelve stained glass windows (1950, 1964) for the Sint-Nicolaaskerk in Schalkhaar
 Six stained glass windows (1951–1952) for the chapel of the college of the Montfortians in Schimmert
 War memorial (1951) in the town hall in Bocholtz
 Stained glass (1952) for the Sint-Dionysiuskerk in Asselt
 Three stained glass windows (1954) for the Maria Gorettikerk in Kerkrade
 Tile mosaic (1956?) in Sphinxkantoor, Maastricht
 Stained glass (1965) for the Heilige Geestkerk in Amstelveen
 Tile pictures (1938?) for Klooster Dolphia (Enschede-Glanerbrug)

Gallery

References

1905 births
1989 deaths
Dutch male painters
People from Meerssen
Glaziers
Dutch graphic designers
Dutch academics